Suderburg is a district in Lower Saxony, Germany. It may also refer to:

Suderburg (Samtgemeinde), a collective municipality in Uelzen, Lower Saxony, Germany

People
Erika Suderburg, American filmmaker
Robert Suderburg (1936–2013), American composer and pianist